Kulakkottan was an early Chola king and descendant of Manu Needhi Cholan who was mentioned in chronicles such as the Yalpana Vaipava Malai and stone inscriptions like Konesar Kalvettu. His name Kulakkottan means 'builder of tank and temple'. 

Kulakkottan was the son of Vararamatevan, said to have been ruler of Chola Nadu and Madurai. The historian and author, Mudaliyar Rasanayagam states that Vararamatevan and Kulakkottan arrived in Trincomalee during the reign of King Pandu of Anuradhapura. Vararamatevan found the Koneswaram temple destroyed by the Buddhist King Mahasena. He decided to restore it, a work which was later continued by his son. He is known as the royal who settled ancient Vanniyars in the east of the island of Eelam.

See also
 List of Tamil monarchs
 Early Cholas
 Legendary early Chola kings

References

Further reading 
 
 
 

Kulakkottan
Tamil monarchs
Chola dynasty